The Advanced Technology Vehicle is a modified Indian sounding rocket developed by the Indian Space Research Organisation (ISRO). It is based on the Rohini-560 rocket. The ATV program was created to test the development of a native dual-mode air-breathing scramjet engine. , ISRO has flown two test missions.

ATV-01
On 3 March 2010 at 03:00 UTC, ISRO conducted the first test flight of the Advanced Technology vehicle, designated ATV-D01. It carried a passive scramjet engine combustor module as a demonstration of the air-breathing propulsion technology.

ATV-02
On 28 August 2016 at 00:30 UTC, the second test flight, designated ATV-D02, was launched from the Satish Dhawan Space Centre. Massing , the rocket carried an active scramjet engine demonstrator. At 55 seconds into the flight, the scramjets ignited at Mach 6 and functioned for about 5 seconds.

Flame was sustained in one engine for 18 seconds and in the other for 14 seconds, producing net positive thrust.

See also

 RLV Technology Demonstration Programme

References

External links

Sounding rockets of India
Scramjet-powered aircraft
2010s in India
2010 in spaceflight
2016 in spaceflight
Satish Dhawan Space Centre